The first 1977 ATP Buenos Aires official name the River Plate Championships, was an Association of Tennis Professionals men's tennis tournament that was played on outdoor clay courts at the Buenos Aires Lawn Tennis Club in Buenos Aires, Argentina and held from 14 April through 17 April 1977. First-seeded Guillermo Vilas won the singles title.

Finals

Singles

 Guillermo Vilas defeated  Wojciech Fibak 6–4, 6–3, 6–0
 It was Vilas' 2nd singles title of the year and the 21st of his career.

Doubles
 Wojciech Fibak /  Ion Ţiriac defeated  Lito Álvarez /  Guillermo Vilas 7–5, 0–6, 7–6
 It was Fibak's 1st title of the year and the 16th of his career. It was Tiriac's 1st title of the year and the 13th of his career.

References

External links 
 ITF tournament edition details

River Plate Championships (Tennis), 1977
ATP Buenos Aires
ATP Buenos Aires
River P
April 1977 sports events in South America